Cédric Baseya (born 19 December 1987) is a former professional footballer who played as a forward. Born in France, he made one appearance for the DR Congo U20 national team.

Club career
Baseya was born in Brétigny-sur-Orge, Essonne. He formerly played for Southampton in the English Championship.

On 17 November 2007, he made his debut with Crewe Alexandra after signing for them on loan for one month the previous day.

He made his Southampton debut as a last-minute substitute against Ipswich Town on 1 March 2008 but did not touch the ball in the short time he was on the pitch. Baseya moved to Lille on a Bosman on 2 July 2008, and was loaned out on 10 August 2009 to Le Havre AC.

On 21 September 2011, Baseya signed a 12-month contract with Reading. On 24 November 2011, he was loaned out on a short-term deal to League Two side Barnet, making his debut on 25 November in a 2–1 home win against Macclesfield Town when he came on as a second-half substitute for Mark Marshall. At the end of the season, 2 May 2012, Baseya was released by Reading.

In November 2013 Baseya joined Bulgarian A PFG side PFC Lokomotiv Sofia on a two-year contract. Baseya scored on his Lokomotiv debut, coming on as a 57th-minute substitute and scoring in the 69th minute, in a 2–1 defeat against Chernomorets Burgas. Baseya made his first start for Lokomotiv in their next game, a 2–0 away win over Slavia Sofia in which he scored the first goal, in the second leg of the second round of the Bulgarian Cup. Baseya played for Monza in 2015.

International career
Although born in France, he qualifies to play for the Democratic Republic of Congo via his parents. He was called up for their full international side but the game was cancelled and he has since represented them at Under 20 level in a 2–1 defeat by Argentina.

References

External links
Player profile on Southampton's website

1987 births
Living people
People from Brétigny-sur-Orge
French sportspeople of Democratic Republic of the Congo descent
Citizens of the Democratic Republic of the Congo through descent
French footballers
Footballers from Essonne
Association football forwards
Democratic Republic of the Congo footballers
Ligue 1 players
English Football League players
First Professional Football League (Bulgaria) players
Southampton F.C. players
Crewe Alexandra F.C. players
Lille OSC players
AS Cherbourg Football players
Reading F.C. players
Barnet F.C. players
FC Lokomotiv 1929 Sofia players
A.C. Monza players
French expatriate footballers
Democratic Republic of the Congo expatriate sportspeople in England
Expatriate footballers in England
Democratic Republic of the Congo expatriate sportspeople in France
Expatriate footballers in France
Democratic Republic of the Congo expatriate sportspeople in Bulgaria
Expatriate footballers in Bulgaria
Democratic Republic of the Congo expatriate sportspeople in Italy
Expatriate footballers in Italy
Black French sportspeople